Hydnellum amygdaliolens is a species of tooth fungus in the family Bankeraceae. Found in the Iberian Peninsula, it was described as new to science in 2011. It smells strongly of bitter almonds. Its spores measure 5.25–6.5 by 4.5 μm.

References

External links 
 

Fungi described in 2011
Fungi of Europe
amygdaliolens